Archibald S. Bryant (July 1, 1803 – March 29, 1883) was an American politician, serving as a member of the Iowa House of Representatives from Council Bluffs, Iowa.

Early life
Bryant was born in Powhatan County, Virginia. In his late 20s, he moved to Kentucky. In 1831, he married P. G. Montgomery.

Career
After moving to Missouri, he was elected County Judge in Putnam County in 1949. In 1852, he moved to Council Bluffs, that same year being elected as a Democrat to the state legislature, where he represented western Iowa from 1852 to 1854. He was also involved in real estate.

Later life 
He continued to live in Council Bluffs, where he died on March 29, 1883.

References

Place of birth missing
Place of death missing
1803 births
1883 deaths
19th-century American politicians
Businesspeople from Iowa
Businesspeople from Kentucky
Businesspeople from Virginia
Democratic Party members of the Iowa House of Representatives
Politicians from Council Bluffs, Iowa
19th-century American businesspeople